Jacky Wong Shu Hei (王樹熹) (born 11 September 1998), also known as Jacky Jai, is a Hong Kong child actor who was born on 11 September 1998.  He has an older brother, Jeffrey Wong (王秉熹), who was a child actor.

Education 

Wong had his primary education at S.K.H Yuen Chen Maun Chen Primary School (大埔聖公會阮鄭夢芹小學) located at Tai Po in Hong Kong. As of September 2015, he is a Form 6 student at the Band 1 school, SKH Bishop Mok Sau Tseng Secondary School. He acted in many Hong Kong dramas and is noted for his cuteness when he was younger. With a score of 22 in the HKDSE, Wong attends the City University of Hong Kong, majoring in Media and Communication.

In the TV series Father and Sons, Wong played the role of Man Hang-Yu (Jimmy).

Filmography 
 The Conqueror's Story ----Man Jai=2004
 The Last Breakthrough----Bok Jai=2004
 The Gateau Affairs ----Ko Bun=2005
 Misleading Track----Yuen Yun Lok=2005
 Healing Hands 3----Hei Hei=2005
 Hidden Treasures----Cheuk Chun Hien=2005
 Always Ready ----Jacky=2005
 The Herbalist's Manual ----Hang Hang=2005
 When Rules Turn Loose ----Cheung Wai Ming/Siu Yuen Tze=2005
 Ten Brothers ----Sap Yat Jai(ep 20)=2007
 War and Destiny ----young Hau Yee=2007
 The Family Link ----Fong Dat=2007
 Devil's Disciples ----young King Lui=2007
 Fathers and Sons ----Man Yu Hang,Jimmy/Jimmy Jai=2007
 Men Don't Cry ----young Ho Kei Kin=2007
 The Ultimate Crime Fighter ----Lok Lok (Moses Chan's nephew)=2007
 Wasabi Mon Amour ----Tam Ka Lok=2008
 The Master of Tai Chi ----young Mo Ma=2008
 Love Exchange ----Sik Gwong Jai=2008
 Last One Standing ----Billy Jai-2008
 Just Love II----Ho Ming/Ming Jai=2009
 A Watchdog's Tale ----Random Kid=2010

References

Living people
1998 births
Hong Kong male child actors
TVB veteran actors
Hong Kong male television actors